Orsolya Tóth (born 20 November 1981) is a Hungarian actress. She has appeared in 26 films since 2002. She played the title role in the film Johanna, which was screened in the Un Certain Regard section at the 2005 Cannes Film Festival.

Selected filmography
 Johanna (2005)
 Delta (2008)
 Lourdes (2009)
 Women Without Men (2009)
 The Notebook (2013)
 The Eremites (2016)

References

External links

1981 births
Living people
Hungarian film actresses
People from Békéscsaba